The Maidan Daily is an Urdu newspaper published from Peshawar and Quetta in Pakistan. The owner and editor of Maidan Daily is Rahmat Shah Afridi.

See also 
 List of newspapers in Pakistan
 Frontier Post

External links
 Frontier Post

Daily newspapers published in Pakistan
Publications with year of establishment missing
Urdu-language newspapers published in Pakistan
Mass media in Peshawar
Mass media in Quetta